The Bellarine Rail Trail is a 32 km walking and cycling track on the Bellarine Peninsula, in Victoria, Australia, that follows the route of the former South Geelong to Queenscliff branch line. It runs from South Geelong to Queenscliff, passing through the towns of Leopold, Curlewis and Drysdale.  
The rails have been removed from the western section between South Geelong and Drysdale.

Sections of the rail trail between South Geelong Station and the Bellarine Highway, and Melaluka Rd, through Leopold and Curlewis to Drysdale are sealed to provide a quality surface in high traffic areas. the surrounding reserves feature areas of remnant, indigenous vegetation, creating an interesting, safe and tranquil environment for users. 

The Bellarine Railway operates a tourist railway between Drysdale and Queenscliff, and the walking track runs parallel to the railway in this 16 km eastern section.  The route traverses farmland with scattered patches and strips of native vegetation, mainly eucalypt woodland.

See also 
 Queenscliffe Visitor Information Centre
 Cycling in Geelong
 Ted Wilson trail

References 

Bike rides around Melbourne 3rd edition, 2009, Julia Blunden, Open Spaces Publishing,

External links 
 
 Bellarine Rail Trail -  City of Greater Geelong
 Friends of the Bellarine Rail Trail
 Railtrails Australia: Bellarine Rail Trail
 Using the Bellarine Rail Trail as part of a weekend adventure

Rail trails in Victoria (Australia)
Hiking and bushwalking tracks in Victoria (Australia)
Bellarine Peninsula
Borough of Queenscliffe